XEJP-AM (1150 kHz) is a radio station in Mexico City. The station is owned by Grupo Radio Centro and operated by Grupo Acustik as Arre en Acustik.

History
While the concession for XEJP was awarded in 1936 for a station on 1130 kHz, owned by Salvador Monterrubio R., it began broadcasts on September 15, 1955. In 1964, it took on what would be its longest-running format, Radio Variedades with a wide-ranging catalog of music in Spanish.

In 1996, Radio Variedades and the XEJP callsign moved to 1320, and in return 1150 became news-formatted "Formato 21" XECMQ-AM. In October 2001, 1150 and 790 swapped formats. "Formato 21" went to 790, while 1150 adopted the Spanish oldies format "El Fonógrafo" which had aired on 790 since its 1990 launch. The XEJP calls were reclaimed in 2004 after, in the Infored/Radio Centro split, 1320 became XENET.

In 2017, citing "changes in AM transmission infrastructure", Grupo Radio Centro reorganized all of its AM radio stations, shutting down several and consolidating their programs. El Fonógrafo moved to XEN-AM 690, airing its musical programming from 10am to midnight. XEJP then went silent. The "Fonógrafo" format later became 24-hour again as an online and HD Radio-only stream, but was suspended after a fire affected GRC, and wouldn't return until 2019.

In January 2019, the IFT approved GRC diplexing XEJP with XEN at its San Miguel Teotongo transmitter site and reducing daytime power from 50,000 to 20,000 watts. XEJP began testing from the new site on August 6, 2019 and resumed regular programming as an Acustik Radio station on September 2, 2019. That same day, Acustik began programming two other former Radio Centro AM stations, XEUNO-AM in Guadalajara and XEMN-AM in Monterrey.

External links

References

1936 establishments in Mexico
Grupo Radio Centro
Radio stations in Mexico City
Radio stations established in 1936
Regional Mexican radio stations
Spanish-language radio stations